Edwin Mills (6 March 1857 – 25 January 1899) was an English cricketer. He played 43 first-class matches for Nottinghamshire and Surrey between 1878 and 1887.

See also
 List of Nottinghamshire County Cricket Club players
 List of Surrey County Cricket Club players

References

External links
 

1857 births
1899 deaths
Cricketers from Nottinghamshire
English cricketers
Non-international England cricketers
North v South cricketers
Nottinghamshire cricketers
Old Oxonians cricketers
Orleans Club cricketers
Surrey cricketers
W. G. Grace's XI cricketers